HB or Hb may refer to:

Academia
 H-b index, an extension of the h-index used in determining academic impact
 H-B Woodlawn, a secondary education program in Arlington, Virginia, US
 Hathaway Brown School, an all-girls private school in Shaker Heights, Ohio, US

Arts and media
 HB (band), a Finnish Christian symphonic metal musical group
 Hanna-Barbera, a cartoon studio, later folded into Warner Bros. Animation and Cartoon Network Studios
 Heaven Below, an American rock band
Helluva Boss, an adult animated TV show

Businesses and brands
 HB (car), a 1920s automobile
 HB (cigarette), a German brand of cigarettes
 HB Construction, a private US general contractor construction business
 HB Ice Cream, an Irish brand
 Asia Atlantic Airlines (IATA code HB)
 Hamilton Bradshaw, a London-based private equity firm
 Hampton and Branchville Railroad (H&B)
 Holland & Barrett (H&B), a UK health food shop chain
 Hasbro, an American toy company

Places
 Bremen (state) (license plate: HB), a German state
 Croatian Republic of Herzeg-Bosnia
 Hawke's Bay Region, a region of New Zealand
 Hermosa Beach, California, a city in southern California, US
 Hubei (Guobiao abbreviation HB), a province of China
 Huntington Beach, California, a city in southern California, US

 Switzerland and Liechtenstein (aircraft registration prefix), distinguished by use of emblems
 Zürich Hauptbahnhof (often shortened to HB), the central train station in Zürich, Switzerland

Science and technology
 HB pencil (hard black), a classification of pencils
 HB, a flammability rating as set forth in UL 94
 Horizontal branch, in astrophysics
 HB, a level in the Brinell scale hardness test

Medicine

 Heart block, cardiovascular system disease that involves the heart's electrical conduction system
 Hemoglobin (Hb), group of iron-containing proteins found in most animals which primary function is to carry oxygen to the tissues
 Hepatitis B, a human viral infection
 His bundle, a specialized collection of cells in the vertebrate heart

Sport
 Half-back line, the positions of three players in Australian rules football
 Halfback (American football), an American football position
 Half back (association football), another name for a midfielder
 Handball (disambiguation), a number of sports
 Havnar Bóltfelag, a football team in the Faroe Islands
 Herfølge Boldklub, a football team in Denmark
 Holstebro Boldklub, a football team in Denmark

People
 H. B. Acton (1908–1974), political philosopher
 H. B. Bailey (1936–2003), NASCAR driver
 H. B. Higgins (1851–1929), Australian politician
 H. B. Reese (1879–1956), candy maker
 H. B. Warner (1875–1958), motion picture executive

Politics 

 Herri Batasuna, defunct far-left Basque nationalist political party in Spain

Other uses
 Half-board, a housing arrangement in which the host provides only a breakfast and dinner meals

See also
 Hull and Barnsley Railway (H&BR)
 "2HB", a song by Roxy Music
 HB2, North Carolina House Bill 2
 BH (disambiguation)
 Њ, Nje, a letter of the Cyrillic script